Acacia drummondii, commonly known as Drummond's wattle, is a perennial shrub endemic to Western Australia.

Description
The branches are thin and reddish and appear close to the ground. It has mid-green to slightly bluish green ornamental foliage. It blooms between June and October producing inflorescences with yellow flowers.

Taxonomy
The species was first formally described by the botanist John Lindley in 1839 as part of the work A Sketch of the Vegetation of the Swan River Colony. It was reclassified by Leslie Pedley in 2003 as Racosperma drummondii then transferred back to the genus Acacia in 2006.

The species name honours James Drummond, the Government Naturalist of the Swan River Colony.

Distribution
It has a disjunct distribution extending north from the Wheatbelt region south to the Great Southern region around Albany. It is found in a variety of habitat including among granite outcrops, in gullies and low lying areas and on hillsides and grows well in sandy and gravelly soils often around laterite. It often forms part of the understorey in the forests and woodland communities.

See also
List of Acacia species

References 

drummondii
Acacias of Western Australia
Trees of Australia
Fabales of Australia
Plants described in 1839
Taxa named by John Lindley